The Grigorovich TB-5 was an experimental heavy bomber designed and tested in the Soviet Union in the early 1930s. Designed as a competitor for the Tupolev TB-3, the TB-5 was intended to be powered by two FED 24-cylinder X engines of 746 kW (1,000 hp) each. When these were canceled, the underwing pods were revised to each house a pair of Bristol Jupiter engines in a push-pull configuration. Despite projected performance inferior to TB-3, it was hoped that TB-5 would gain an advantage by using less metal (in short supply at the time) thanks to its mixed construction of fabric-covered metal frame.

Test flights began on 1 May 1931 with disappointing results, in part due to poor thrust of the rear-facing engines. The prototype TB-5 was wrecked in a crash landing following the in-flight detachment of an engine in the spring of 1932, and with the entry into service of the superior TB-3 that year, the TB-5 project was abandoned.

Specifications (TB-5)

See also

References

1930s Soviet bomber aircraft
Grigorovich aircraft